Charles Peter Ellison (born 26 January 1991) is an English former university cricketer. Ellison played four first-class cricket matches for Oxford MCCU between 2011 and 2013 as a right-arm seam bowler. He was born at Canterbury in Kent in 1991 and attended Millfield School in Somerset. His father is Richard Ellison who played for Kent County Cricket Club and the England cricket team.

Ellison played his first-class cricket whilst studying for a degree in sport and exercise science at Oxford Brookes University, He made his first-class debut for Oxford MCCU against Nottinghamshire in 2011.

Ellison comes from a cricketing family. His great-grandfather, Henry Ellison, and uncle, Charles Ellison, both played first-class cricket and his father played 11 Tests and 14 One Day Internationals for England and made over 200 first-class appearances in a career which spanned 14 seasons in county cricket.

References

External links

1991 births
Living people
Sportspeople from Canterbury
People educated at Millfield
Alumni of Oxford Brookes University
English cricketers
Oxford MCCU cricketers